Riter Boyer House is a historic home located in West Whiteland Township, Chester County, Pennsylvania. The house was built in three sections, with the oldest sections dated to about 1800. The oldest part is a -story, three-bay pointed-stone structure with a rear stuccoed-stone kitchen wing.  A major stuccoed-stone four-bay wing was added about 1850.

It was listed on the National Register of Historic Places in 1983.

References

Houses on the National Register of Historic Places in Pennsylvania
Houses completed in 1800
Houses in Chester County, Pennsylvania
National Register of Historic Places in Chester County, Pennsylvania